William John Rose (9 May 1931 – 10 October 2007) was an Australian rules footballer who played for Collingwood in the Victorian Football League (VFL) during the early 1950s.

Rose was a follower in Collingwood's 1953 premiership side, having been a back pocket in the team which lost the Grand Final a year earlier.

His brothers, Bob, Kevin and Ralph were also Collingwood players.

References

Holmesby, Russell and Main, Jim (2007). The Encyclopedia of AFL Footballers. 7th ed. Melbourne: Bas Publishing.

1931 births
Collingwood Football Club players
Collingwood Football Club Premiership players
Australian rules footballers from Victoria (Australia)
2007 deaths
One-time VFL/AFL Premiership players